"Will We Talk?" is a song performed by English musician Sam Fender. The song was released as a digital download on 2 July 2019 by Polydor Records as the second single from his debut studio album Hypersonic Missiles. The song was written by Fender, who also produced the song along with Rich Costey and Bramwell Bronte. The song peaked at number 43 on the UK Singles Chart and number 11 on the Scottish Singles Chart. On physical versions of the album the song is featured on, Hypersonic Missiles, the song name is listed instead as "Will we talk in the morning?".

Background and composition
"Will We Talk?" depicts the tale of a one-night stand. Robin Murray of Clash magazine explained that the song is "a crisp new indie rock burner that rattles along with a rock 'n' roll  spirit". Tom Skinner of NME described the song as "a heady blast of high-octane, melody-packed, smash'n'grab rock'n'roll that launches from the traps at full pelt and doesn't relent until the guitars and a string-section subside three minutes later."

Music video
A music video to accompany the release of "Will We Talk?" was first released on YouTube on 29 August 2019.

Track listing

Charts

Certifications

Release history

References

2019 songs
Sam Fender songs
Polydor Records singles